MZKT-7930 Astrolog is a Russian army 8×8 transporter-erector-launcher designed and developed by the MZKT in Belarus. It was first developed in the early 1990's, with the first prototype being made in 1994 (although it would not see service until 2000 when it was adopted by Russia).

Description 
The MZKT-79292 is a 10 x 10 MZKT-7930 derivative intended for heavyweight TEL applications, and is a direct competitor to the BAZ-6909 10 x 10 variants.

Gallery

See also 
MAZ-7310
MZKT-79221
KAMAZ-7850

References

External links
 http://www.military-today.com/trucks/mzkt_7930.htm

Military vehicles of Russia
Self-propelled rocket launchers
Missile launchers
Military vehicles introduced in the 2000s
Military vehicles of Belarus